Sherwood Stewart and Zina Garrison were the defending champions but lost in the third round to Mark Kratzmann and Jenny Byrne.

Jim Pugh and Jana Novotná defeated Kratzmann and Byrne in the final, 6–4, 5–7, 6–4, to win their fourth Mixed Doubles tennis title, the first at the Wimbledon Championships.

Seeds

  Jim Pugh /  Jana Novotná  (champions)
  Ken Flach /  Jill Hetherington (first round)
  Rick Leach /  Betsy Nagelsen (semifinals)
  Robert Seguso /  Lori McNeil (semifinals)
  John Fitzgerald /  Elizabeth Smylie (second round)
  Sherwood Stewart /  Zina Garrison (third round)
  Patrick McEnroe /  Gigi Fernández (third round)
  Mark Woodforde /  Hana Mandlíková (second round)
  Danie Visser /  Rosalyn Fairbank (third round)
  Peter Doohan /  Elise Burgin (third round)
  Robert Van't Hof /  Robin White (second round)
  Tom Nijssen /  Manon Bollegraf (third round)
  Jorge Lozano /  Catherine Suire (second round)
  Mark Kratzmann /  Jenny Byrne (final)
  Pieter Aldrich /  Elna Reinach  (first round)
  Michael Mortensen /  Tine Scheuer-Larsen (third round)

Draw

Finals

Top half

Section 1

Section 2

Bottom half

Section 3

Section 4

References

External links

1989 Wimbledon Championships – Doubles draws and results at the International Tennis Federation

X=Mixed Doubles
Wimbledon Championship by year – Mixed doubles